Asheville Brewing Company is a craft brewery in Asheville, North Carolina. One of a plethora of breweries on the "south slope" of the city, the company was Asheville's third brewery, after Highland Brewing and Green Man. Until a move in 2015, it was western North Carolina's oldest continuously operated brewery.

As of 2014, the brewery had plans to produce up to 13,000 barrels of beer per year.

References

External links 
Official site

Companies based in Asheville, North Carolina
Beer brewing companies based in North Carolina